Félix Monti (born 1938) is an Argentine film cinematographer.

Two of his films have been critically well received: The Official Story (1985) and The Holy Girl (2004).
also "The Secret in Their Eyes" 2009 nominee for an Academy Award for Best Foreign Film.

Filmography (partial)
 La Historia oficial (1985) aka The Official Story
 Old Gringo (1989)
 The Plague (1992)
 Un Muro de Silencio (1993) aka A Wall of Silence
 Bela Donna (1998) aka White Dunes
 O Auto da Compadecida (2000) aka A Dog's Will
 Caramuru – A Invenção do Brasil (2001)
 Rosarigasinos (2001) aka Gangs from Rosario
 A Partilha (2001) aka The Inheritance
 Assassination Tango (2002) aka Assassination Tango
 A Paixão de Jacobina (2002) aka The Passion of Jacobina
 Peligrosa obsesión (2004)
 La Niña santa (2004) aka The Holy Girl
 Nordeste (2005)
 El secreto de sus ojos (2009)

Television (partial)
 Vientos de agua (2005) TV series

External links
 
 

Argentine cinematographers
1938 births
Living people
Place of birth missing (living people)